David Pedersen Kvile (21 September 1861 – 24 June 1918) was a Norwegian teacher, farmer and politician for the Liberal Party.

He was born at Kvile in Breim as a son of farmers Peder A. Kvile and Kirsti J. Kaudal. He graduated from Stord Teachers' College in 1882, and worked briefly in Gransherred from 1883 before settling as a teacher in Øvre Rendal in 1885. From 1890 he also ran the farm Berger. He married a farmer's daughter from Gransherred.

He was a member of Øvre Rendal municipal council from 1893 to 1904, serving as mayor since 1897. In 1911 he again became mayor after a hiatus. He was elected as a deputy representative to the Parliament of Norway in 1909, 1912 and 1915. He died in June 1918 and was buried in Øvre Rendal.

References

1861 births
1918 deaths
People from Gloppen
Stord/Haugesund University College alumni
Norwegian schoolteachers
Norwegian farmers
Mayors of places in Hedmark
Deputy members of the Storting
Liberal Party (Norway) politicians
People from Rendalen